West Simsbury is a census-designated place (CDP) and section of the town of Simsbury in Hartford County, Connecticut, United States. The population of the CDP was 2,447 at the 2010 census.

Geography
West Simsbury occupies the west-central part of the town of Simsbury and is bordered to the east by Simsbury Center and to the south by Weatogue. Connecticut Route 309 is the main road through the community, leading east to Simsbury Center and northwest to North Canton.

Demographics

As of the census of 2000, there were 2,395 people, 745 households, and 659 families residing in the CDP. The racial makeup of the CDP was 96.58% White, 0.67% African American, 0.04% Native American, 1.80% Asian, 0.04% Pacific Islander, 0.08% from other races, and 0.79% from two or more races. Hispanic or Latino of any race were 0.54% of the population.

There were 745 households, out of which 47.7% had children under the age of 18 living with them, 81.6% were married couples living together, 4.8% had a female householder with no husband present, and 11.5% were non-families. 10.1% of all households were made up of individuals, and 6.4% had someone living alone who was 65 years of age or older.  The average household size was 2.98 and the average family size was 3.20.

In the CDP, the population was spread out, with 30.9% under the age of 18, 2.3% from 18 to 24, 21.7% from 25 to 44, 26.5% from 45 to 64, and 18.7% who were 65 years of age or older.  The median age was 42 years. For every 100 females, there were 91.6 males.  For every 100 females age 18 and over, there were 85.2 males.

The median income for a household in the CDP was $154,765.The per capita income for the CDP in 2012 was $69,036.  None of the families and 1.3% of the population were living below the poverty line, including no under eighteens and 5.6% of those over 64.

Landmarks
Tulmeadow Farm - Founded in 1768, Tulmeadow Farm is now best known for its home-made ice cream. With the help of the Simsbury Land Trust, much of Tulmeadow Farm's farmland is protected from future development.

Residents
 Owen Brown, father of abolitionist John Brown, lived in West Simsbury.

References

Simsbury, Connecticut
Census-designated places in Hartford County, Connecticut
Census-designated places in Connecticut